Shahin Bushehr F.C. is a multi-use stadium in Bushehr, Iran. It is currently used for football matches and is the home stadium of Iran Pro League team Iranjavan F.C. The stadium holds 15,000 people.

Football venues in Iran
Buildings and structures in Bushehr Province
Sport in Bushehr Province